Charles Marc "Boo-Boo" Bourgeois (born November 19, 1959) is a Canadian former professional ice hockey defenceman who played 290 games in the National Hockey League. He played for the Calgary Flames, St. Louis Blues, and Hartford Whalers.

In the early 1980s, Bourgeois played for the Université de Moncton hockey team. He helped lead the team to the Canadian Interuniversity Sport championship in his final year of university. That year, he was named all-Canadian as one of the two best university defencemen in Canada.

Bourgeois led the Moncton Hawks to the Calder Cup finals, as a coach during the 1993–94 AHL season. He also coached the Universite de Moncton hockey team for several years, and guided the team to the Atlantic university championship a few years ago. He also played two years of professional hockey in Europe.

Bourgeois operates a summer hockey school in Moncton, and he is president of Atlantic Hockey Group, which works with over 10,000 youth and adult hockey players each year. He is dedicated to helping kids improve their hockey skills. Bourgeois has conducted special hockey camps for children from Asia.

On 13 December 1974, Charlie’s father Cpl Aurèle Bourgeois (age 47) and Constable Michael O’Leary (age 33) of the Moncton Police Force were murdered after being forced to dig their own graves.

Career statistics

Regular season and playoffs

References

External links 
 
Atlantic Hockey Group Website: https://www.atlantichockeygroup.com/

1959 births
Living people
Binghamton Whalers players
Calgary Flames players
Canadian ice hockey defencemen
Chamonix HC players
Colorado Flames players
Français Volants players
Hartford Whalers players
Ice hockey people from New Brunswick
Moncton Hawks players
Oklahoma City Stars players
Sportspeople from Moncton
St. Louis Blues players
Undrafted National Hockey League players